The Flying Pig is a public house in Hills Road, Cambridge.

It was first recorded as The Engineer in 1844 and then renamed The Crown Inn in 1860.  It was renamed "The Flying Pig" by landlord Mick Clelford in the 1980s as he was a pilot and nicknamed "The Pig".

Customers have included Pink Floyd members Syd Barrett and David Gilmour, who met there, and mathematician Michael Guy.

In 2008, the local council approved plans to demolish The Flying Pig, but petitions and protests kept the pub open until October 2021, when The Pig permanently closed its doors.

See also
 Pigs on the Wing

References

1844 establishments in England
Pubs in Cambridge